Ymittos, is a suburb of Athens, Greece. Since the 2011 local government reform it is part of the municipality Dafni-Ymittos, of which it is a municipal unit. With a land area of 0.975 km², it was the second-smallest municipality in Greece (after Nea Chalkidona) before 2011. It is situated 2.5 km southeast of the Acropolis of Athens. Ymittos has two lyceums.

Historical population

References

External links
Ymittos weather station 

Populated places in Central Athens (regional unit)